The Pulaski is a special hand tool used in fighting fires, particularly wildfires,
which combines an axe and an adze in one head. Similar to a cutter mattock, it has a rigid handle of wood, plastic, or fiberglass. The Pulaski is used for constructing firebreaks, able to both dig soil and chop wood. It is also well adapted for trail construction, and can be used for gardening and other outdoor work for general excavation and digging holes in root-bound or hard soil. The axe blade of the Pulaski is the primary cutting edge, while the adze blade is secondary; this is the opposite of the cutter mattock, in which the adze blade is the larger of the two. 

The invention of the Pulaski is credited to Ed Pulaski, an assistant ranger with the United States Forest Service in 1911. Similar tools were introduced in 1876 by the Collins Tool Company. A tool that serves the same purpose was used in the Alps for over 300 years for planting trees (Wiedehopfhaue) or the dolabra in ancient Rome. Pulaski was famous for taking action to save the lives of a crew of 45 firefighters during the disastrous August 1910 wildfires in Idaho. His invention (or reinvention) of his namesake tool may have been a result of the disaster, as he saw the need for better firefighting tools. Pulaski further refined the tool by 1913, and it came into use in the Rocky Mountain region. In 1920 the Forest Service began contracting for the tool to be commercially manufactured but its use remained regional for some years. The tool became a national standard in the 1930s.

An initialed ("E.P.") tool, which purportedly belonged to Pulaski himself, is part of the collection of the Smithsonian Institution at the Wallace District Mining Museum in Wallace, Idaho.

Aside from a knife, the only tool that was issued to the participants in the American reality series Naked and Afraid aired March 24, 2019 on the Discovery Channel show was a Pulaski.

See also
 Driptorch
 Fire flapper (tool)
 Fire rake
 Flare
 Halligan bar
 McLeod (tool)
 Pickaroon

References

External links
 

Firefighter tools
Forestry tools
Mechanical hand tools
Wildfire suppression equipment